Eumetriochroa miyatai is a moth of the family Gracillariidae. It is known from the islands of Hokkaidō, Honshū, Shikoku and Kyūshū in Japan.

The wingspan is 6.1–9 mm for the vernal (spring) form and 5.7-6.9 mm for the aestival (summer) form. There are two seasonal forms, which differ in size and colour: one is a vernal form with adults on wing in spring from April to July, and the other is an aestival form with adults on wing in summer from July to early September.

The larvae feed on Ilex species, including Ilex crenata, Ilex pedunculosa and Ilex rotundata. They mine the leaves of their host plant. The mine is found on the upper side of the leaf and is whitish, narrowly linear, irregularly curved, but usually following the margin of the previous gallery and sometimes occupying almost the whole surface of the leaf. A pupal chamber is found at the end of the mine. It is ellipsoidal, with a swollen lower side and a wrinkled upper side. The species is overwinters in larval stage within evergreen leaves of the food plant.

References

Phyllocnistinae
Moths of Japan